Gurney is a ghost town in Cass County, Illinois, United States. Gurney was located in Ashland Township, on Illinois Route 125 between Philadelphia and Ashland.

References

External links
Photograph of Gurney School

Geography of Cass County, Illinois
Ghost towns in Illinois